Sever is a parish in the municipality of Santa Marta de Penaguião, Portugal. The population in 2011 was 714, in an area of 6.17 km2.

References

Freguesias of Santa Marta de Penaguião